Joe Sykes (1898 – 1974) was an English professional footballer who played for Sheffield Wednesday and Swansea Town.

Having spent the majority of his young adulthood in the armed forces, Sykes joined Sheffield in 1919, before moving to Swansea in 1924. He spent the rest of his career with the Swans, becoming club captain and leading his side to their first ever promotion as champions of a division in 1925.

Skyes finished playing in 1935 after making 345 league appearances for Swansea. He returned to the club after the Second World War to work as a trainer and a scout, and later caretaker manager.

Skyes died in Morriston Hospital on 4 September 1974 at the age of 76.

References

Sheffield Wednesday F.C. players
Swansea City A.F.C. players
Association footballers not categorized by position
English footballers
1898 births
1974 deaths